Hualaihué Airport  is an airport serving Hualaihué, a village in the Los Lagos Region of Chile.

The runway is at the tip of a small peninsula in the Gulf of Ancud, and an overrun on the southern end drops into the water.

See also

Transport in Chile
List of airports in Chile

References

External links
OpenStreetMap - Hualaihué
OurAirports - Hualaihué
FallingRain - Hualaihué Airport

Airports in Los Lagos Region